The three Ursitoare, in Romanian mythology, are supposed to appear three nights after a child's birth to determine the course of its life. They are similar to the Greek Fates or Moirai.

The Fates appearing to baptize children has been part of Romanian tradition for hundreds of years. In recent years there has been a "physical materialization" too of this tradition through the show presented during the name party.

Names
Fieldwork in the Oltenia region found dialectal variations of their names: ursătóri(le), ursitóri(le), ursătoáre(le).

Role
According to ethnologist Pauline Schullerus (fr), the Ursitoari comes at night to the newborn's cradle and weaves their fate.

Parallels
Scholarship indicates that similar beings (a trio of women that allot men's fates) also exist in South Slavic folklore, among the Serbians, Macedonians, Croatians, Bulgarians and Montenegrinians.

References

Notes

Bibliography

Further reading
 Hulubaş, Adina. "Ipostaze ale divinităţilor destinului în credinţe arhaice şi în literatura populară" [Hypostases of the Destiny Gods in Secular Beliefs and Folk Literature)]. In: Anuarul Muzeului Etnografic al Moldovei [The Yearly Review of the Ethnographic Museum of Moldavia] 12/2012, pp. 173-188.

See also
Fates

Romanian mythology
Time and fate goddesses
Triple goddesses